An Australian Approved Name (AAN) is a generic drug name set by the Therapeutic Goods Administration (TGA) for use in Australia. In late 2016, the TGA changed several drug names to the corresponding international nonproprietary name (INN), or, in cases where an INN was not available (as with asparaginase), another established generic name, such as the United States Adopted Name (USAN).

See also

 International Nonproprietary Name
 British Approved Name
 United States Adopted Name
 Japanese Accepted Name

Reference list

Pharmacological classification systems
Names